Gaou Guinou was an African prince who has been claimed to be the grandfather of famed Haitian revolutionary Toussaint L’Ouverture. He may have been in the royal family of Allada as well as a member of the Fon people. He was reportedly captured and enslaved by his brother, Hussar, and his wife, Queen Aitta in 1724. According to the autobiography of L’Ouverture, Gaou Guinou was born around the year 1698 and lived to be over 105 years old. 

According to Haitian oral traditions, Gaou Guinou's father, Soso, died in 1724 and left two sons to fight for the succession: Hussar and Gaou Guinou. Hussar fled to Abomey while Gaou Guinou, the younger brother, took power of Great Ardra. Hussar then allied himself with Agaja, the ruler of Dahomey, and returned to battle his brother for the throne thereafter. He was ultimately victorious, and sold Gaou Guinou into slavery after his capture.

The former king is said to have eventually arrived in today's Haiti, where he soon started a family. This family is believed to be the family of L’Ouverture. Whilst still constrained to the life of a slave, Guinou nevertheless enjoyed certain privileges within the confines of his owners' estate. This included being allocated a portion of land and the labour of five enslaved Africans to work it.

References

African royalty